In combinatorial mathematics, the Albertson conjecture is an unproven relationship between the crossing number and the chromatic number of a graph. It is named after Michael O. Albertson, a professor at Smith College, who stated it as a conjecture in 2007; it is one of his many conjectures in graph coloring theory. The conjecture states that, among all graphs requiring  colors, the complete graph  is the one with the smallest crossing number.

A conjectured formula for the minimum crossing number
It is straightforward to show that graphs with bounded crossing number have bounded chromatic number: one may assign distinct colors to the endpoints of all crossing edges and then 4-color the remaining planar graph. Albertson's conjecture replaces this qualitative relationship between crossing number and coloring by a more precise quantitative relationship. Specifically,
a different conjecture of  states that the crossing number of the complete graph  is

It is known how to draw complete graphs with this many crossings, by placing the vertices in two concentric circles; what is unknown is whether there exists a better drawing with fewer crossings. Therefore, a strengthened formulation of the Albertson conjecture is that every -chromatic graph has crossing number at least as large as the right hand side of this formula. This strengthened conjecture would be true if and only if both Guy's conjecture and the Albertson conjecture are true.

Asymptotic bounds
A weaker form of the conjecture, proven by M. Schaefer, states that every graph with chromatic number  has crossing number  (using big omega notation), or equivalently that every graph with crossing number  has chromatic number .  published a simple proof of these bounds, by combining the fact that every minimal -chromatic graph has minimum degree at least  (because otherwise greedy coloring would use fewer colors) together with the crossing number inequality according to which every graph  with  has crossing number . Using the same reasoning, they show that a counterexample to Albertson's conjecture for the chromatic number  (if it exists) must have fewer than  vertices.

Special cases
In these cases,  has crossing number zero, so the conjecture states only that the -chromatic graphs have crossing number greater than or equal to zero, something that is true of all graphs. Through the efforts of several groups of authors the conjecture is now known to hold for all .

Related conjectures
There is also a connection to the Hadwiger conjecture, an important open problem in combinatorics concerning the relationship between chromatic number and the existence of large cliques as minors in a graph. However, counterexamples to the Hajós conjecture are now known, so this connection does not provide an avenue for proof of the Albertson conjecture.

Notes

References

.
.
.
.
.
.
.

Topological graph theory
Graph coloring
Conjectures
Unsolved problems in graph theory